Klock Hill is a mountain located in Central New York region of New York southwest of Burlington, New York.

Once claimed as the highest point in Otsego County, a century ago they even had a wooden observation tower built for tourists and were locked in bitter debate with folks in Maryland that claimed Hooker Mountain was tallest. Actually named for a resident whose name was "Klock".

References

Mountains of Otsego County, New York
Mountains of New York (state)